First Taste is the debut album by American band Potliquor released in November 1970.

While First Taste never quite broke onto the Billboard album chart, the magazine did report in mid-October/early November 1970 that "Riverboat", a single from the album was being played at the University of Wisconsin radio station and at Queens College in Queens, New York and again in early November that the album was receiving airplay by radio stations run by Southern Methodist University and the University of Minnesota. They also posted a notice later in the month that the GRT Corporation, the corporate owner of Janus Records, was generating "much excitement behind its debut album by Potliquor, First Taste" in Toronto, Ontario, Canada.

Track listing

Personnel
 Jerry Amoroso – drums, percussion, vocals
 George Ratzlaff – keyboards, rhythm guitar, harp, percussion, vocals
 Guy Schaeffer – bass guitar, vocals
 Les Wallace – guitars, vocals

Additional
 Jim Brown – producer
 Cy Frost – engineer
 Sam Forbes – photography
 The Graffiteria – album cover design
 Dorothy Schwartz – album coordinator
 Ron Scerbo – production coordinator
 Artistic Promotional Enterprises – management
 Great South Artists – direction

References

External links

1970 debut albums
Potliquor albums
Janus Records albums